Luis Arias (3 September 1930 – 23 April 1970) was a Spanish alpine skier. He competed at the 1952, 1956 and the 1960 Winter Olympics.

References

1930 births
1970 deaths
Spanish male alpine skiers
Olympic alpine skiers of Spain
Alpine skiers at the 1952 Winter Olympics
Alpine skiers at the 1956 Winter Olympics
Alpine skiers at the 1960 Winter Olympics
Sportspeople from Madrid
20th-century Spanish people